Oyfn Sheydweg  (At the Crossroads)    is a 1930 novel by Eli Schechtman. It is his first published work.

Plot summary
The novel describes the decline of the shtetl after the October Revolution.
Sсhechtman's heroes go through difficult times of “crossroads”; to the place described by Shekhtman, the revolution “doesn’t drive along a wide highway, but drags heavily in gardens, rolls down a mountain, leaning against the Jews like a thundercloud”.

References

External links
 USHMM Afn sheydṿeg / Elie Shekhṭman - Collections Search - United States Holocaust Memorial Museum

1930 novels
Yiddish-language literature
Novels by Eli Schechtman